3Dconnexion is a German manufacturer of human interface devices for manipulating and navigating computer-generated 3D imagery. These devices are often referred to as 3D motion controllers, 3D navigation devices, 6DOF devices (six degrees of freedom) or a 3D mouse.

Commonly utilized in CAD applications, 3D modeling, animation, 3D visualization and product visualization, users can manipulate the controller's pressure-sensitive handle (historically referred to as either a cap, ball, mouse or knob) to fly through 3D environments or manipulate 3D models within an application. The appeal of these devices over a mouse and keyboard is the ability to pan, zoom and rotate 3D imagery simultaneously, without stopping to change directions using keyboard shortcuts or a software interface. 3Dconnexion devices are compatible with over 300 applications including Autodesk Inventor, Autodesk Fusion 360, AutoCAD, Siemens NX, CATIA, SOLIDWORKS, PTC Creo, Solid Edge, Blender, Rhinoceros, Revit, SketchUp, Unreal Engine, Unity, Cinema4D, 3ds Max, Maya, Google Earth, Second Life, NASA World Wind, Virtual Earth 3D, Geomagic, T-FLEX CAD, Photoshop, and more.

Products

CadMouse Pro Wireless, CadMouse Pro Wireless Left, CadMouse Pro 
CadMouse Compact Wireless, CadMouse Compact
SpaceMouse Enterprise
SpaceMouse Pro Wireless, SpaceMouse Pro
SpaceMouse Wireless, SpaceMouse Compact
Keyboard Pro with Numpad
Discontinued products:
SpaceNavigator, SpaceNavigator for Notebook (Discontinued)
SpaceExplorer (Discontinued)
SpacePilot, SpacePilot Pro (Discontinued)
SpaceTraveler (Discontinued)
SpaceBall (Discontinued)
Magellan/SpaceMouse Classic/Plus/XT serial or USB (Discontinued)

History

3Dconnexion was formed in September 2001 by Logitech, combining LogiCAD3D, based in Europe, and Labtec’s 3D peripheral business, based in the United States. The two companies combined  have over 20 years of experience in 3D input devices. LogiCAD3D's product, the Magellan controller, was used in fields such as automotive design and aerospace. A NASA project used a Magellan product to control a robot in space. The SpaceBall also had a history in space, having been used to remotely drive the Sojourner robot on Mars.

References

External links
3Dconnexion.com
Free software driver and SDK for Linux
3Dconnexion section on Spacemice.org

Human–computer interaction
Companies based in San Jose, California
Video game control methods
Logitech